Lake Beyşehir (anciently, Carallis or Karallis, or Caralis or Karalis (Κάραλις)) is a large freshwater lake in Isparta and Konya provinces in southwestern Turkey. It has an area of 650 km² and is 45 km long and 20 km wide. It carries the same name as the principal urban centre of its region, Beyşehir. Anciently, it was considered part of ancient Isauria.

The lake is fed by streams flowing from the Sultan Mountains and the Anamas Mountains. The water level in the lake often fluctuates by year and by season. Lake Beyşehir is used for irrigation and aquaculture, although it is also a national park. There are thirty-two islets in varying sizes in the lake. Lake Beyşehir is also an important site for many bird species.

The maximum depth is 10 metres.

Water in the lake was at its lowest level during the period 1960-1990 in October 1975 at 1121.96 metres, with 64,500 hectares of water surface. The highest water level in the same period was 1125.50 metres in March 1981, with a surface area of 74,600 hectares.

See also
 List of lakes in Turkey
 Taşköprü, a historic regulator dam and bridge next to the lake
 Lake Beyşehir National Park

References 

 Lake Beyşehir at BirdLife International

External links 

 Documentary by ADOKBEL (Association Of Anatolian Natural And Cultural Documentaries)

Beysehir
Beysehir
Landforms of Isparta Province
Beyşehir District
Tourist attractions in Konya Province
Tourist attractions in Isparta Province
Important Bird Areas of Turkey